Donna Milner (born 1946) is a Canadian writer.

Milner was born and raised in Victoria BC. She lives in Williams Lake, British Columbia, with her husband Tom. Donna wrote and published the books After River, The Promise of Rain, Somewhere in Between, and A Place Called Sorry. She is often called the "Oh, so Canadian author.

Books

After River
Her 2008 book After River is, according to bcbooklook, "about a woman coming to terms with the disintegration of her family some 35 years after a young American draft resister named River crossed the border into Canada and changed their lives". The book had a 4/5 star rating on goodreads.com, from over 1,700 ratings . By 2015, the book had been published in 12 countries and into 8 languages.

Somewhere In Between
Milner described this book as "the story of a family dealing with loss and tragedy". One of the characters in the book, Virgil Blue, was inspired by a one-time resident of Milner's home city of Williams Lake, British Columbia.

Personal life
Milner was born in Victoria BC in 1946 and was raised in Vancouver. She moved to Rossland where she married and had children. Having previously worked as a realtor for 25 years, Milner said in a 2014 interview she and her husband had lived in the Cariboo for 40 years. She described that prefers writing in the morning and insists upon herself of writing at least two pages in longhand before she can leave the room. She used to go on writing retreats near Eagle Lake with a friend.

Recognition
Her book After River was listed in a top five fiction books list by The Gettysburg Times in 2008, who described it as "beautifully written", while The Promise of Rain was listed in The Globe and Mail top 100 books in 2010. 9.

Bibliography 
After River (2008)
The Promise of Rain (2010)
Somewhere In Between (2014)
A Place Called Sorry (2015)

References

External links 
 Homepage
 2008 interview

1946 births
Living people
Canadian women novelists
21st-century Canadian novelists
21st-century Canadian women writers